Melillo is a surname. Notable people with this surname include:

 Alberto Melillo (1866–1915), Italian painter 
 Angela Melillo (born 1967), Italian actress, showgirl, model, singer, and television hostess
 Cheri Melillo (1949-2009), the founder of CANstruction, a food charity that creates sculptures from cans
 David Andrew Melillo (born 1988), the American former lead guitarist for the rock band Anarbor
 Ezequiel Melillo (footballer, born 1990), Argentine professional football midfielder for Almirante Brown
 Ezequiel Melillo (footballer, born 1993), Argentine professional football midfielder for Vibonese
 Joseph V. Melillo, the executive producer at the Brooklyn Academy of Music (BAM) from 1999 to 2018
 Michael Melillo (born 1982), former American professional baseball player
 Oscar Donald "Ski" Melillo (1899–1963), American second baseman and coach

See also 
 Milillo